Geraldine Page (November 22, 1924June 13, 1987) was an American actress who earned critical recognition as a stage actress on Broadway as well as in feature films and television. Over the course of her career, which spanned over three decades, Page earned a total of eight Academy Award nominations, three Emmy nominations, and four Tony nominations. She won the Academy Award for Best Actress for her performance in The Trip to Bountiful (1985).

Screen

Film

Television

Stage roles

See also
List of awards and nominations received by Geraldine Page

Notes

References

Works cited

Actress filmographies
American filmographies